The 2002–03 2. Bundesliga was the 29th season of the 2. Bundesliga, the second tier of the German football league system. SC Freiburg, 1. FC Köln and Eintracht Frankfurt were promoted to the Bundesliga while Eintracht Braunschweig, SSV Reutlingen, FC St. Pauli and Waldhof Mannheim were relegated to the Regionalliga.

League table
For the 2002–03 season Wacker Burghausen, Eintracht Trier, VfB Lübeck and Eintracht Braunschweig were newly promoted to the 2. Bundesliga from the Regionalliga while SC Freiburg, 1. FC Köln and FC St. Pauli had been relegated to the league from the Bundesliga.

Results

Top scorers
The league's top scorers:

References

External links
 Official Bundesliga site  
 2. Bundesliga @ DFB 
 kicker.de 

2. Bundesliga seasons
2
Germany